Upper Falls is an unincorporated community in Baltimore County, Maryland, United States. southeast of Kingsville. Upper Falls has a post office with ZIP code 21156.

References

External links
 St. Stephen's Church founded 1841
 Salem United Methodist Church founded 1847
 Upper Falls Casino (1896) on the southeast corner of Bradshaw & Raphel Roads.
 Huber's Family Produce Farm
 Upper Falls School (circa 1890) at 11614 & 11616 Franklinville Road

Unincorporated communities in Baltimore County, Maryland
Unincorporated communities in Maryland